Langegg bei Graz is a former municipality in the district of Graz-Umgebung in the Austrian state of Styria. Since the 2015 Styria municipal structural reform, it is part of the municipality Nestelbach bei Graz.

Population

Notable people
Johann Joseph Fux: music theorist known for Gradus ad Parnassus, an influential treaty on counterpoint. He was born in Langegg bei Graz in 1660.

References

Cities and towns in Graz-Umgebung District